Davey Lake is a lake in Red Deer County, Alberta, Canada.

Davey Lake was named for a pioneer citizen.

See also
List of lakes of Alberta

References

Lakes of Alberta